Fenerbahçe can further refer to:

Place 
Fenerbahçe is the name of a neighbourhood in Kadıköy district, Istanbul, Turkey, located on the Asian side at the shore of the Sea of Marmara. The name means "lighthouse garden" in Turkish (from fener, meaning "lighthouse", and bahçe, meaning "garden"), deriving from an ancient lighthouse located at Fenerbahçe Cape.

Sports 
Fenerbahçe S.K., a major Turkish multi-sport club which have won numerous European and domestic titles over the club's history. Based in Asian part of Istanbul.
 Football Department:
 Fenerbahçe Men's Football, the professional football team of the multi-sport club. Founded in 1907.
 Fenerbahçe Women's Football, women's football team of Fenerbahçe S.K. Founded in 2021.
 Fenerbahçe U21, U-21 squad of Fenerbahçe S.K.
 Fenerbahçe Football Academy, youth and junior squads of Fenerbahçe S.K.
 Basketball Department:
 Fenerbahçe Men's Basketball, men's basketball team of Fenerbahçe S.K. Founded in 1913.
 Fenerbahçe Women's Basketball, women's basketball team of Fenerbahçe S.K. Founded in 1954.
 Volleyball Department:
 Fenerbahçe Men's Volleyball, men's volleyball team of Fenerbahçe S.K. Founded in 1927.
 Fenerbahçe Women's Volleyball, women's volleyball team of Fenerbahçe S.K. Founded in 1928.
 Amateur Departments:
 Fenerbahçe SW, sailing and windsurfing section of Fenerbahçe S.K. Founded in 1910.
 Fenerbahçe Athletics, athletic section of Fenerbahçe S.K. Founded in 1913.
 Fenerbahçe Boxing, boxing section of Fenerbahçe S.K. Founded in 1914.
 Fenerbahçe Rowing, rowing section of Fenerbahçe S.K. Founded in 1914.
 Fenerbahçe Swimming, swimming section of Fenerbahçe S.K. Founded in 1913.
 Fenerbahçe Table Tennis, table tennis section of Fenerbahçe S.K. Founded in 1928.
 Esports
 Fenerbahçe Esports, esport section Fenerbahçe S.K. Founded in 2016.

Other clubs 
 SKV Fenerbahçe Wien, Austrian semi-professional football club
 FC Fenerbahçe Zürich, Swiss semi-professional football club

Biology 
 Fenerbahce (fish), a genus of African fish named in honor of Fenerbahçe S.K.

See also 

 Fenerbahçe Marina, a marina in Istanbul
 Fenerbahçe Museum, official sports museum of Fenerbahçe S.K.
 Fenerbahçe Radio, official radio channel of Fenerbahçe S.K.
 Fenerbahçe station, a defunct railway station in Fenerbahçe neighbourhood
 Fenerbahçe Şükrü Saracoğlu Stadium, Stadium of Fenerbahçe S.K.
 Fenerbahçe TV, official sports channel of Fenerbahçe S.K.
 Fenerbahçe Ülker Sports Arena, Indoor Arena of Fenerbahçe S.K.
 Genç Fenerbahçeliler, The largest supporters group of Fenerbahçe S.K.